Charles Addo Odametey (23 February 1937 – 29 December 2006) was a Ghanaian football player.

Career
He played as a defender for Accra Hearts of Oak and was one of the original Black Stars, the Ghana national football team. He shares the record for the most appearances in a final of the African Nations Cup having played for the winning team in 1963 and 1965 (as captain) and in the 1968 final.

International
He played for Ghana in the Olympic games of 1964 and 1968.

References

External links
BBC African Nations Cup records

1937 births
2006 deaths
Ghanaian footballers
Ghana international footballers
Association football defenders
Olympic footballers of Ghana
Footballers at the 1964 Summer Olympics
Footballers at the 1968 Summer Olympics
1963 African Cup of Nations players
1965 African Cup of Nations players
1968 African Cup of Nations players
Africa Cup of Nations-winning players
Accra Hearts of Oak S.C. players